The Philippine House Committee on Indigenous Cultural Communities and Indigenous Peoples, or House Indigenous Cultural Communities and Indigenous Peoples Committee is a standing committee of the Philippine House of Representatives.

Jurisdiction 
As prescribed by House Rules, the committee's jurisdiction includes the following:
 Indigenous cultural communities and indigenous peoples of the Philippines
 Development of indigenous communities

Members, 18th Congress

Historical members

18th Congress

Vice Chairperson 
 Nestor Fongwan (Benguet–Lone, PDP–Laban)

See also 
 House of Representatives of the Philippines
 List of Philippine House of Representatives committees
 National Commission on Indigenous Peoples
 Indigenous Peoples' Rights Act of 1997
 Indigenous peoples of the Philippines

Notes

References

External links 
House of Representatives of the Philippines

Indigenous Cultural Communities and Indigenous Peoples